Germany competed at the 2014 Summer Youth Olympics, in Nanjing, China from 16 August to 28 August 2014.

Medalists
Medals awarded to participants of mixed-NOC (Combined) teams are represented in italics. These medals are not counted towards the individual NOC medal tally.

Archery

Germany qualified a male archer from its performance at the 2013 World Archery Youth Championships. Germany later qualified a female archer from its performance at the 2014 European Archery Youth Championships.

Individual

Team

Athletics

Germany qualified 13 athletes.

Qualification Legend: Q=Final A (medal); qB=Final B (non-medal); qC=Final C (non-medal); qD=Final D (non-medal); qE=Final E (non-medal)

Boys
Track & road events

Field Events

Girls
Track & road events

Field events

Mixed events

Badminton

Germany qualified two athletes based on the 2 May 2014 BWF Junior World Rankings.

Singles

Doubles

Basketball

Germany qualified a boys' and girls' team based on the 1 June 2014 FIBA 3x3 National Federation Rankings.

Skills Competition

Boys' Tournament

Roster
Alexander Herrmann
Jannes Hundt
Jonas Niedermanner
Anton Zraychenko

Group Stage

Girls' Tournament

Roster
Patricia Broßmann
Aliyah Konate
Annika Küper
Luana Rodefeld

Group Stage

Last 16

Quarterfinal

Knockout Stage

Beach Volleyball

Germany qualified a boys' and girls' team from their performance at the 2014 CEV Youth Continental Cup Final.

Boxing

Germany qualified one boxer based on its performance at the 2014 AIBA Youth World Championships

Boys

Canoeing

Germany qualified three boats based on its performance at the 2013 World Junior Canoe Sprint and Slalom Championships.

Boys

Girls

Diving

Germany qualified three quotas based on its performance at the Nanjing 2014 Diving Qualifying Event.

Fencing

Germany qualified two athletes based on its performance at the 2014 FIE Cadet World Championships.

Boys

Mixed Team

Field Hockey

Germany qualified a boys' and girls' team based on its performance at the 2013 Youth European Championship.

Boys' Tournament

Roster

Jonas Grill
Luca Großmann
Anton Körber
Lucas Lampe
Jan Mertens
Jannick Rowedder
Felix Schneider
Philip Strzys
Simon Wenzel

Group Stage

9th-place match

Girls' Tournament

Roster

Kyra Angerer
Alena Baumgarten
Lara Bittel
Henrike Duthweiler
Luisa Hohenhövel
Anna Jeltsch
Jana Pacyna
Thea Scheidl
Rieke Schulte

Group Stage

Quarterfinal

Classification 5th-8th place

7th-place match

Golf

Germany qualified one team of two athletes based on the 8 June 2014 IGF Combined World Amateur Golf Rankings.

Individual

Team

Gymnastics

Artistic Gymnastics

Germany qualified one athlete based on its performance at the 2014 European MAG Championships and another athlete based on its performance at the 2014 European WAG Championships.

Boys

Individual finals

Girls

Individual finals

Judo

Germany qualified one athlete based on its performance at the 2013 Cadet World Judo Championships.

Individual

Team

Modern Pentathlon

Germany qualified one athlete based on its performance at the 2014 Youth A World Championships.

Rowing

Germany qualified two boats based on its performance at the 2013 World Rowing Junior Championships.

Qualification Legend: FA=Final A (medal); FB=Final B (non-medal); FC=Final C (non-medal); FD=Final D (non-medal); SA/B=Semifinals A/B; SC/D=Semifinals C/D; R=Repechage

Shooting

Germany qualified one shooter based on its performance at the 2014 European Shooting Championships.

Individual

Team

Swimming

Germany qualified eight swimmers.

Boys

Girls

Mixed

Table Tennis

Germany qualified a male athlete from the 2014 World Qualification Event and a female athlete from the Under-18 World Rankings.

Singles

Team

Qualification Legend: Q=Main Bracket (medal); qB=Consolation Bracket (non-medal)

Taekwondo

Germany qualified four athletes based on its performance at the Taekwondo Qualification Tournament.

Boys

Girls

Triathlon

Germany qualified two athletes based on its performance at the 2014 European Youth Olympic Games Qualifier.

Individual

Relay

Weightlifting

Germany qualified 1 quota in the boys' events based on the team ranking after the 2014 Weightlifting Youth European Championships.

Boys

Wrestling

Germany qualified two athletes based on its performance at the 2014 European Cadet Championships.

Boys

References

2014 in German sport
Nations at the 2014 Summer Youth Olympics
Germany at the Youth Olympics